= Dhiravida Thelugar Munnetra Kazhagam =

Political party in Tamil Nadu, India

G. Kamatchi Naidu, Founder President of DTMK

Dhiravida Thelugar Munnetra Kazhagam (DTMK) (Dravidian Telugu Progressive Federation) is a political party in Tamil Nadu, India. The party general secretary is CMK Reddy and the party president and founder is G. Kamatchi Naidu.

DTMK works for the interests of the Telugu-speaking minority in the state. The party demanded reservations for Telugu speakers in the state administration and possibilities for Telugu medium schooling.

DTMK has been in alliance with several parties including DMK, ADMK, BJP and INC. In the early 2010s, the party was merged with the DMK while the party president Kamatchi Naidu went on to start the Tamil Nadu Naidu Peravai.

Later in July 2011, Kamatchi Naidu proposed at Satyamurthy Bhavan, to join the Indian National Congress.
